Rocinela kapala is a species of isopod in the family Aegidae, and was first described in 1988 by Niel L. Bruce. The species was first described in detail as R. oculata. The species is named for the FRV Kapala, the vessel from which the holotype (AM P31740) was collected at a depth of 450 metres.

It is found in coastal seas of eastern Australia from southern Queensland to Bass Strait.

References

Cymothoida
Crustaceans described in 1988